The  Cleveland Gladiators season was the 17th season for the franchise in the Arena Football League, and their seventh while in Cleveland. The team was coached by Steve Thonn and played their home games at Quicken Loans Arena.

Standings

Schedule

Regular season
The 2016 regular season schedule was released on December 10, 2015.

Playoffs

Roster

References

Cleveland Gladiators
Cleveland Gladiators seasons
Cleveland Gladiators